Jan Marten “Mart” Smeets (born 11 January 1947, in Arnhem) is a Dutch radio and television personality, writer, and columnist.

Television
Mart Smeets is a long-time sports presenter and commentator with the Dutch public broadcaster NOS. He is most famous for his reporting of the Tour de France, but also comments on speedskating, basketball (Smeets played at national level himself), and most other sports, apart from football (although he did present a news program around the 2006 FIFA World Cup). The 2012 Tour de France was his last assignment during his NOS tenure; he announced he'd continue to work for them as a freelancer.

Radio
Smeets also has a weekly radio show, For the Record, on Radio 2, two hours of rarely played music.

Writing
Mart Smeets writes columns for several newspapers and magazines, including Trouw. He is also the author of more than 25 books.

Praise and criticism
Smeets has received a fair amount of criticism from viewers, especially through social media. People watching the 2012 Tour de France shows, for instance, marked off Smeets-cliches on a Smeets Bingo card, and an anti-Smeets Facebook page ("Mart Auf Wiedersehen Smeets") was joined by 40,000 people. Also popular was an online Smeets cliche generator.

See also
 Radio 2

References

External links

 Mart Smeets as presenter of the Studio Sport television programme (in Dutch)
 Website of Mart Smeets' For the Record radio programme (in Dutch)

1947 births
Living people
People from Arnhem
Dutch journalists
Dutch television presenters